The International Photography Hall of Fame and Museum in St. Louis, Missouri honors those who have made great contributions to the field of photography.

History
In 1977 the first Hall of Fame and Museum opened in Santa Barbara, California and a few years later, in 1983 moved to Oklahoma City. IPHF is the first organization worldwide that recognizes significant contributors to the artistic craft and science of photography.

In addition to an extensive collection of photographs and cameras, IPHF offers lectures and other educational opportunities; surrounding all aspects of photography, past, and present, for people of all ages.

Hall of Fame inductees
The IPHF inductees artists and individuals that have changed the art industry with their photography or inventions. IPHF has over 70 inductees and archives over 30,000 images. Each year a nominating committee selects inductees based on their contributions to the art or science of photography and their impact on the history of photography.

1966 Inductees
 William Henry Fox Talbot

1968 Inductees

 George Eastman
 Mathew B. Brady

1971 Inductees
 Alfred Stieglitz

1973 Inductees
 George W. Harris

1974 Inductees
 Edward Steichen

1976 Inductees
 Robert Capa

1978 Inductees
 Erich Salomon

1979 Inductees

 Brassai
 Gertrude Kasebier
 Peter Henry Emerson

1980 Inductees

 Adolf Fassbender
 Pirie MacDonald
 Victor Hasselblad

1982 Inductees
 William Henry Jackson

1984 Inductees

 Ansel Adams
 August Sander
 Bill Brandt
 Dorothea Lange
 Edward Weston
 Eugene Atget
 Imogen Cunningham
 James Van Der Zee
 Oskar Barnack
 Paul Strand
 Walker Evans
 William Eugene Smith
 Yasuzo Nojima

1986 Inductees

 André Kertész
 Clarence White
 Diane Arbus
 Josef Sudek
 Timothy O'Sullivan

1989 Inductees
 Paul Lindwood Gittings

1991 Inductees
 Dr. Edwin Herbert Land

2000 Inductees
 Berenice Abbott

2001 Inductees

 Henri Cartier-Bresson
 Lewis Hine

2002 Inductees

 Carleton Watkins
 Gordon Parks
 Helmut Gernsheim

2003 Inductees

 Andre Adolphe-Eugene Disderi
 Peter Dombrovskis

2004 Inductees

 Frederick Scott Archer
 Robert Frank
 Ruth Bernhard

2005 Inductees

 Beaumont Newhall
 Harold Edgerton
 Manuel Alvarez Bravo

2006 Inductees

 Arnold Newman
 Richard Avedon

2007 Inductees
 Roger Fenton

2013 Inductees
 Yousef Karsh

2016 Inductees

 Annie Leibovitz
 Ernst Haas
 Graham Nash
 John Knoll
 Ken Burns
 Margaret Bourke-White
 Sebastiao Salgado
 Steve Jobs
 Thomas Knoll
 Willard S. Boyle

2017 Inductees

 Anne Geddes
 Cindy Sherman
 Edward Curtis
 Ernest H. Brooks II
 Harry Benson
 James Nachtwey
 Jerry Uelsmann
 Kenny Rogers
 Ryszard Horowitz
 William Eggleston

2018 Inductees

 Joe Rosenthal
 Joel Bernstein
 John Sexton
 John Loengard
 Susan Meiselas
 Walter Looss Jr.

2019 Inductees

 Bruce Davidson
 Elliott Erwitt
 Julia Margaret Cameron
 Mary Ellen Mark
 Olivia Parker
 Paul Nicklen
 Ralph Gibson
 Steve McCurry
 Tony Vaccaro

2020 Inductees 

  Robert Adams
  Lynsey Addario
  Alfred Eisenstaedt
  Hiro
  Jay Maisel
  Duane Michals
  Carrie Mae Weems
  Henry Diltz

2021 Inductees 

  Dawoud Bey
  Larry Burrows
  Philip-Lorca diCorcia
  David Douglas Duncan
  Sally Mann
  Pete Souza
  Joyce Tenneson
  Joel Sartore

2022 Inductees 

 Edward Burtynsky
 Chester Higgins
 Graciela Iturbide
 Helen Levitt
 Danny Lyon
 Sarah Moon

Collection
The IPHF collection focuses on photographic works beginning from the 18th century to the present. In addition to photographs, the museum has a large collection of cameras, darkroom, and studio tools dating back to the late 1800s. The entire collection consists of over 6,000 historical cameras and photography tools and 30,000 photographs. Some of the 19th century photographic tools include Magic Lanterns, a Praxinoscope Theatre, and an Edison Projecting Kinetoscope.

Within the collection can be found a wide variety of photographic memorabilia from historic manuals on processes and techniques to monographs of notable photographers.

Exhibitions
Restrospective, Phil Borges, October 2 – December 1, 2004
Alaska Wild, December 1, 2004 – January 2, 2005
In Plain Sight, Beaumont Newhall, January 7 – April 3, 2005
Stopping Time, Harold Edgerton, January 7 – April 3, 2005
Mestizjae, Manuel Alvarez Bravo, January 7 – April 3, 2005
Photography of Hugh Scott, The Oklahoma City National Memorial, 10 Years Remembering, April 9 – July 3, 2005
An Itinerant Eye, James Walden, July 9 – December 31, 2005
A Life In Photography, Arnold Newman, July 9 – December 31, 2005
Nicholas Orzio's Occupied Japan, Nicholas Orzio, February 16 – May 8, 2017
Vivian Maier, Vivian Maier, February 18 – May 31, 2018
Cabbagetown, Oraien Catledge, January 23 – April 1, 2019
40th Year Anniversary: Nanjing-St. Louis Sister City: Retrospective, April 27 – July 6, 2019
Moment By Moment, John Loengard, July 20 – September 9, 2019
2019 Hall of Fame Induction and Awards Exhibition, November 2, 2019 – March 7, 2020

References

Photography museums and galleries in the United States
Photography awards
Awards established in 1965